The Dookoła Mazowsza (Around Mazovia) is a cycling race held annually in Mazovia, Poland. It was first held in 1951 and has been held annually since, with the exceptions of 1981–1982, 1991–1992, and 1994–1996. The most successful rider is Zenon Czechowski, who won the race four times between 1969 and 1972. Since 2005, it has been part of the UCI Europe Tour, classified as a 2.1 race in 2005 and since 2006 as a 2.2 race.

Past winners

External links

 (since 2005)
  (until 2004)

Cycle races in Poland
Recurring sporting events established in 1951
Sport in Masovian Voivodeship
UCI Europe Tour races
1951 establishments in Poland
Summer events in Poland